Group is a name service database used to store group information on Unix-like operating systems. The sources for the group database (and hence the sources for groups on a system) are configured, like other name service databases, in nsswitch.conf.

Seeing available groups on a Unix system 

The contents of the group database (and available groups) can be seen with a variety of tools:

Command line 
The getent command can be used to fetch group information.

Fetching a list of all available groups 
getent group

Fetching a specific group 
For a specific group called 'users':
getent group users

Python 
grp - The Group Database — a Python module

Unix authentication-related software